Levan Patsatsia (born September 24, 1988) is a former Georgian basketball player for the Georgian national team, where he participated at the EuroBasket 2015. He retired as a player in 2019 due to injuries, and was appointed as the head coach of Arena-Orbi in Georgian A-Liga for the 2020 season.

Family
His sister, Tika is a model, singer and TV host.

External links
 NCAA stats
 Euroleague profile

References

1988 births
Living people
BC Nizhny Novgorod players
Men's basketball players from Georgia (country)
Small forwards
Basketball players from Tbilisi
Shooting guards
BC Dinamo Tbilisi players